Alfred Henry Kellett (October 30, 1901 – July 14, 1960) was a relief pitcher in Major League Baseball who played for the Boston Red Sox (1923) and Philadelphia Athletics (1924). He was born in Red Bank, New Jersey.

In a six-game career, Kellett posted a 0–1 record with a 6.30 ERA in 10 innings of work.

Kellett died in New York City at age 58.

External links

Boston Red Sox players
Philadelphia Athletics players
Major League Baseball pitchers
Columbia Lions baseball players
Baseball players from New Jersey
People from Red Bank, New Jersey
Sportspeople from Monmouth County, New Jersey
1901 births
1960 deaths
Burials at Ferncliff Cemetery